I Am Somebody is a 1969 short political documentary by Madeline Anderson about black hospital workers on strike in Charleston, South Carolina. This was the first half-hour documentary film by an African-American woman in the film industry union. This film is one of the first to link black women and the fight for civil rights. In 2019, the film was selected by the Library of Congress for preservation in the United States National Film Registry for being "culturally, historically, or aesthetically significant".

Summary
Four hundred black hospital and nursing home employees, all but 12 women, organize for higher pay and unionization for over 100 days in Charleston, South Carolina. The film follows the efforts of the strikers as they receive help from Coretta Scott King and both praise and admonishment from the public, even capturing the National Guard's arrival to the strikes. The documentary captures the workers' fight, considered "...one of the south’s most disruptive and bitter labor confrontations since the 1930s”, for recognition through the lens of an African-American women, and focuses on striker and mother Claire Brown. With the help of thousands of inspired protestors, the efforts are ultimately successful.

Production
Anderson was commissioned to create a documentary about the strike by the Hospital Workers Union Local 1199. She used archival footage and interviews with strikes and city officials. Of the commission, Anderson recalls:

Anderson shared an interest in fighting for equity: "I knew that the obstacles that were before me were based on gender, race and politics...I tried to make a film that reflected my experience through their eyes." The film captures the events through a feminist's lens.

Reception
Civil rights leaders praised the film; Fannie Lou Hamer said "..this film packs a tremendous punch and is deeply moving at the same time." Manohla Dargis of The New York Times called it a "a familiar story of social injustice and self-determination that relates to the larger civil rights movement even as it remains rooted in specific lives".

In popular culture
Clips from the film appeared in a 2008 episode of The Colbert Report.

References

External links 
 I Am Somebody at the Internet Movie Database

Further reading
 Madeline Anderson in Conversation: Pioneering an African American Documentary Tradition
 BFC/A Documentaries on the Civil Rights and Black Nationalist Movements
 DAUGHTERS OF THE DIASPORA: A Filmography of Sixty-Five Black Women Independent Film- and Video-Makers
 Warren, Shilyh. “Recognition on the Surface of Madeline Anderson’s I Am Somebody.” Signs, vol. 38, no. 2, 2013, pp. 353–378. JSTOR, JSTOR, www.jstor.org/stable/10.1086/667201.
 Warren, Shilyh. Films for the Feminist Classroom. Film review: I Am Somebody. Directed by Madeline Anderson. Brooklyn: Icarus Films, (1969) 1999. 30 minutes. http://ffc.twu.edu/issue_4-2/rev_Shilyh%20Warren_4-2.html
 Cynthia A. Young, Soul Power: Culture, Radicalism, and the Making of a U.S. Third World Left. (Durham, NC: Duke University Press, 2006).

1970 films
United States National Film Registry films
1970s English-language films